Usiinae is a subfamily of bee flies in the family Bombyliidae. There are at least 3 genera and 180 described species in Usiinae.

Genera
These three genera belong to the subfamily Usiinae:
 Apolysis Loew, 1860 i c g b
 Parageron Paramonov, 1929 c g
 Usia Latreille, 1802 c g
Data sources: i = ITIS, c = Catalogue of Life, g = GBIF, b = Bugguide.net

References

Further reading

 
 

Bombyliidae
Articles created by Qbugbot
Asilomorpha subfamilies